Birech is a masculine given name of Kenyan origin.
The term Birech is derived from the word birechik which means army ants in Kalenjin 

Jairus Kipchoge Birech (born 1992), Kenyan steeplechase runner
Joseph Kiptoo Birech (born 1984), Kenyan long-distance runner and two-time winner of the Great Scottish Run

Kalenjin names